Ex Drummer is a 2007 Belgian black comedy and rock music film directed by Koen Mortier, whose previous work was limited to television commercials. It is based on the 1994 book by Herman Brusselmans of the same name. While receiving mixed reviews at the time, it went on to become a cult film.

Plot 
In Ostend, West Flanders, three physically disabled musicians are looking for a drummer for their punk rock band. They want to perform only one time at a music competition. They approach famous writer Dries to be their drummer, the idea being that he also has a "handicap" in that he cannot actually play the drums. They plan to master only one song, Devo's "Mongoloid." For Dries, this is an opportunity to get some inspiration for a new novel, so he accepts the offer. The band members decide to call the band The Feminists, since, they think four "handicapped" musicians are just as worthless as a group of feminists. Their main opponents are the band Harry Mulisch (an allusion to Harry Mulisch), also led by a writer, nicknamed Dikke Lul ("Fat Cock"). As the story goes on Dries becomes more and more obsessed by his new novel and he tries to manipulate the band members and tries to find their weak spot.

Cast
 Dries Vanhegen: Dries
 Norman Baert: Koen de Geyter
 Sam Louwyck: Ivan Van Dorpe
 Gunter Lamoot: Jan Verbeek
 Tristan Versteven: Dorian
 Dolores Bouckaert: Lio
 Barbara Callewaert: Christine
 François Beukelaers: Pa Verbeek
 Bernadette Damman: Ma Verbeek
 Jan Hammenecker: Dikke Lul

Soundtrack
The music of The Feminists was in fact performed by Belgian band Millionaire and the Harry Mulisch song was sung by Belgian singer Flip Kowlier.

 Lightning Bolt – "2 Morro Morro Land"
 Madensuyu – "Papa Bear"
 An Pierlé & White Velvet – "Need You Now"
 The Tritones – "Chagrin De La Mer"
 Mogwai – "Hunted by a Freak"
 The Experimental Tropic Blues Band – "Mexico Dream Blues"
 Flip Kowlier – "De Grotste Lul Van 't Stad"
 Millionaire – "Mongoloid"
 Isis – "In Fiction"
 Isis – "Grinning Mouths"
 Arno Hintjens – "Een Boeket Met Pissebloemen"
 Augusta National Golf Club – "People in Pairs"
 Mel Dune – "Time Hangs Heavy on Your Hands"
 Ghinzu – "Blow"
 Funeral Dress – "Hello from the Underground"
 Millionaire – "Deep Fish"
 Blutch – "Moving Ground"

Reception
The film received mixed reviews. On Rotten Tomatoes the film has an approval rating of 44% based on 18 reviews, with an average rating of 4.81/10. On Metacritic, the film has a rating of 36 out of 100 based on 4 reviews, indicating "generally unfavorable reviews". In Belgium it caused some controversy due to the violence and explicit sex in the film.

Awards
 Fant-Asia Film Festival
 won Jury Prize Best First Feature-Koen Mortier
 Raindance Film Festival
 won Jury Prize Debut Feature-Koen Mortier
 Warsaw International Film Festival
 won Special Jury Award-Koen Mortier
 Rotterdam International Film Festival
 Tiger Award-Koen Mortier

References

External links
 
 

2007 films
Belgian biographical films
Belgian comedy films
Belgian rock music films
2000s Dutch-language films
Belgian LGBT-related films
Films based on Flemish novels
Films set in Belgium
Belgium in fiction
2000s crime films
2007 comedy-drama films
2000s musical films
Punk films
LGBT-related horror films
LGBT-related musical films
2007 LGBT-related films
Films about disability
Dutch-language Belgian films